This is a list of racing drivers from Brazil – Brazilians who raced in events such as Formula One and the IndyCar Series, etc.

List

References

+
Lists of auto racing people
Racing